Tioman Airport , also known as Pulau Tioman Airport, is an airport serving Tioman Island, Pahang, Malaysia. It is located next to Tekek village (Kampung Tekek).
The relatively small size of aircraft able to take off and land at Tioman means that per seat costs are relatively high making it hard for airlines operating out of the island to remain profitable. The airport's runway is "one way" as planes can only land from and take off in one direction (north) due to nearby terrain.  Tioman is a popular destination for private pilots based in Singapore and Malaysia, as it is only a little more than one hour away by air from Seletar Airport compared to over 5 hours by surface transport.

Airlines and destinations

Traffic and statistics

Statistics

References

External links

 Short Take-Off and Landing Airports (STOL) at Malaysia Airports Holdings Berhad
 
 Japamala Resorts providing flights from Subang, replacing disrupted Berjaya Air
 SAS Charters to Tioman

Airports in Pahang
Tioman Island